Canohès is a commune in the Pyrénées-Orientales department in southern France.

Geography

Localisation 
Canohès is located in the canton of Perpignan-5 and in the arrondissement of Perpignan.

Population

See also

Communes of the Pyrénées-Orientales department

References

Communes of Pyrénées-Orientales